Selby Apartments is a historic three-building apartment complex in Omaha, Nebraska built in 1942.  It was designed in the Prairie School style by architect Reinholdt F. Hennig, and was built by Frank Selby. It was listed on the National Register of Historic Places in 2004.

References

External links

National Register of Historic Places in Omaha, Nebraska
Prairie School architecture in Nebraska
Residential buildings completed in 1942
1942 establishments in Nebraska